Alison Lewis is a South African chemical engineer known for her research in crystallisation and precipitation as applied to the recovery of valuable metals. She is Dean of the Faculty of Engineering and the Built Environment at the University of Cape Town (UCT) and is a member of UCT’s Senior Leadership Team. Lewis is also the founder and director of UCT’s Crystallisation and Precipitation Research Unit.

Early life and education 
Lewis attended school at Pinetown Convent School in KwaZulu Natal and then St Mary’s Anglican School for Girls in Johannesburg. She earned a PhD in Civil Engineering from the University of Cape Town in 1993 after obtaining a BSc and MSc in Chemical Engineering at the same institution.

Under her maiden name, Billing, Lewis served on the UCT Students Representative Council from 1983 to 1985. An anti-apartheid activist she was detained without trial in 1986 under the Section 3.1 of the 1986 State of Emergency legislation From 1988 to 1990 as Alison Ozinsky, she was a member of the Cape Democrats in the United Democratic Front and served as the editor for the organisation’s journal, Upfront.

Academic career 
Lewis began her academic career as a senior lecturer in UCT’s Department of Chemical Engineering in 1995, becoming an Associate Professor in 2002. She became a full professor in the same department in 2007 and served as Head of Department from January 2013 until June 2015 when she was appointed Dean of the Faculty of Engineering & the Built Environment. She is the first woman to have held this deanship at UCT.

The National Research Foundation has rated Lewis as Researchers who enjoy considerable international recognition by their peers for the high quality and impact of their recent research outputs since 2009.

Awards and honours

Received the NRF President’s Champion of Research Capacity Development at South African Higher Education Institutions Award in 2010. 
Received the Distinguished Woman Scientist Award from the Department of Science and Technology at the South African Women in Science Awards for Research and Innovation in 2015.
She received the Engineering Research Capacity Development Award from the National Science and Technology Forum (NSTF) in 2019.
Fellow of the Institution of Chemical Engineers (FIChemE), the South African Institute of Chemical Engineers (FSAIChE) and the South African Academy of Engineering (FSAAE).

Selected works

References

External links 

Living people
Year of birth missing (living people)
South African chemical engineers
University of Cape Town alumni
Academic staff of the University of Cape Town
Alumni of St Mary's School, Waverley